Boye Skistad (born 4 March 1948) is a retired Norwegian football midfielder and later manager.

He spent his entire career in Mjøndalen, except for one mediocre season in SK Brann. He also managed Mjøndalen, guiding the team to the 1992 Eliteserien. Skistad represented Norway as an U19, U21 and senior international. He was a twin brother of Brede Skistad.

References

1948 births
Living people
Norwegian footballers
Mjøndalen IF players
SK Brann players
Norway youth international footballers
Norway under-21 international footballers
Norway international footballers
Association football midfielders
Norwegian football managers
Mjøndalen IF Fotball managers
Norwegian twins
Twin sportspeople